Nyctiprogne is a genus of nightjar in the family Caprimulgidae.

It contains the following species:
 Band-tailed nighthawk (Nyctiprogne leucopyga)
 Plain-tailed nighthawk (Nyctiprogne vielliardi)

 
Bird genera
Taxa named by Charles Lucien Bonaparte
Taxonomy articles created by Polbot